Attila Vadkerti (born 22 February 1982) is a Hungarian handballer who plays for SC Pick Szeged and the Hungarian national team.

He made his international debut on 16 November 2004 against France.

Vadkerti competed in handball at the 2012 Summer Olympics.

Achievements
Nemzeti Bajnokság I:
Winner: 2007
Silver Medalist: 2002, 2003, 2004, 2005, 2006, 2008, 2009, 2010, 2011, 2012, 2013, 2014, 2015
Bronze Medalist: 2000, 2001
Magyar Kupa:
Winner: 2006, 2008
Finalist: 2000, 2002, 2003, 2004, 2005, 2007, 2009, 2010, 2012, 2013, 2014, 2015
EHF Cup:
Winner: 2014

Individual awards
   Silver Cross of the Cross of Merit of the Republic of Hungary (2012)

References

External links
 
 
 
 
 

1982 births
Living people
Hungarian male handball players
Olympic handball players of Hungary
Handball players at the 2012 Summer Olympics
Sportspeople from Szeged